Charles James Freeborn was a graduate of Yale University in 1899, where he was a member of the St. Elmo Society. He was one of the earliest Yale men to volunteer for active service in World War I. He was a captain in the United States Army, and a recipient of the Croix de Guerre from the French for his service. After the War ended, four years of active service left him too weak to recover from influenza, and, as a result, pneumonia ensued. On February 13, 1919, three weeks after his demobilization, Freeborn died in his home in Paris. He is buried in Oakland, California at Mountain View Cemetery

References

 http://net.lib.byu.edu/estu/wwi/memoir/afshist/Mem8.htm

Year of birth missing
United States Army personnel of World War I
Burials in California
1919 deaths